In the Finnish Army, a Partiosanomalaite m/83 (Parsa) is a compact communications device for reconnaissance units. The device can send free- and limited length messages, but writing is more inconvenient than with a proper messaging device, for example for communicating fire commands two buttons need to be pressed.

Determined length messages 

 1 TUKOM Fire control
 2 KORJAUS Altering fix to match enemy movements
 3 TUSII Fix target change
 4 MÄÄRITÄ Determine target
 5 KT HAV 1 Contacts with respect to target
 6 KT HAV 2 Contacts with respect to fire control
 7 MAALILUETTELO (Target list)
 8 ILMOITTAUTUMINEN (Reporting/Withdraw from messaging position)
 9 TIEDUSTELUTIETOJA (Recon data)
 0 LIIKENTEENLASKENTA (General traffic count)

Capabilities 

 The keyboard has 33 characters that can perform all possible functions.
 16 character LED-display
 Transmit memory 2000 characters.
 Receive memory 8 messages or 2000 characters.
 Can send morse messages.
 Powered by 6 AA-batteries.
 Weight ~1 kg.
 Partiosanomalaite was designed and is manufactured by Nokia.

Finnish Army
Military communications